John Dynham Cornish Pellow MBE (1890–1960) was an English poet and civil servant.

Life
Pellow was born in London, where his father, William Pellow, was a civil servant. He wrote poetry throughout his life.

Professionally, Pellow followed in his father's footsteps and joined the National Health Insurance Commission in 1908. In 1913, he was promoted, and eventually reached the rank of Senior Executive Officer. On his retirement in 1950, he was awarded an MBE.

Poetry
Poems by Pellow were included in the fourth and fifth anthologies of Georgian Poetry, for 1918–1919 and 1920–1922, edited by Sir Edward Marsh and also in several later anthologies:
Thomas Caldwell (1922), The Golden Book of Modern English Poetry
J. C. Squire (1927), Selections from Modern Poets Complete Edition
J. C. Squire (1932), Younger Poets of To-day
Eric Gillett (1932), Poets of Our Time
Harold Monro (1933), Twentieth Century Poetry
The Golden Treasury, with additional poems (1941), Oxford University Press
Selected Poems (Staples Press, 1945) with George Every, S. L. Bethell

See also
Georgian Poetry

References

1890 births
1960 deaths
Civil servants from London
English male poets
Writers from London
20th-century English poets
20th-century English male writers
Members of the Order of the British Empire